Parashqevi Qiriazi, also known as Paraskevi D. Kyrias (2 June 1880 – 17 December 1970) was an Albanian teacher of the Kyrias family who dedicated her life to the Albanian alphabet and to the instruction of written Albanian language. She was a woman participant at the Congress of Manastir, which decided the form of the Albanian alphabet, and the founder of the Yll' i Mengjesit, a women's association. Parashqevi was also a participant in the Paris Peace Conference, 1919 as a member of the Albanian-American community. She was the sister of Sevasti Qiriazi, who was the director of the first Albanian School for girls in Korça, opened in 1891.

Biography
Parashqevi was born in Monastir (now Bitola, in the Manastir Vilayet, Ottoman Empire (present-day North Macedonia). When she was only 11 she started to help her brother Gjerasim Qiriazi and sister Sevasti Qiriazi to teach written Albanian to girls in the first school for girls in Albania, the Girls' School, which opened on 15 October 1891.

She later studied at Robert College in Istanbul. Upon graduation she went to Korçë to work as an elementary teacher along with her sister, Sevasti at the Mësonjëtorja, the first Albanian school which had opened in 1887.

In 1908, she was a participant in the Congress of Monastir and the only woman to be there.

In 1909, she published an abecedarium for elementary schools. Although the Congress of Monastir had decided about the new alphabet, two versions of the alphabet were still present in her abecedary, which shows how fragile the consensus of the Congress still was. However, along with the abecedarium, she published some very well known verses on the defense of the new Albanian alphabet:

She is also known for having organized teaching for children and night schools in other southern Albania villages and for helping to organize local libraries.

She contributed to the foundation of the Yll' i Mëngjesit association in 1909 and later, when she had migrated to the US, she continued to publish the periodical with the same name from 1917 to 1920. The magazine was published every fortnight and included articles on Albanian politics, society, history, philology, literature, and folklore.

In 1914 she left Albania for Romania along with her sister as a consequence of the Greek occupation of the city.

She later went to the United States and became a member of the Albanian-American community, on behalf of which she participated in the Conference of Peace of Paris in 1919 to represent the rights of the Albanians.

Parashqevi returned to Albania in 1921, after which she followed political developments there with interest, without losing sight of national aspirations. She became one of the founders and directors of the Female Institution named "Kyrias," after her family, in Tiranë and Kamëz, in cooperation with her sister Sevasti and brother-in-law Kristo Dako.

In October 1928, at the initiative of the Ministry of Interior, the organization "Gruaja Shqiptare" ("The Albanian woman") was founded in Tirana, with plans to create branches nationwide and in the diaspora. It was created under the patronage of the Queen Mother and King Zog's sister Princess Sanije. The organization aimed at promoting education, hygiene, and charitable activities, and raising Albanian women to a higher cultural level. As a well-educated woman, Parashqevi succeeded in gaining a leadership position in it. Between 1929 and 1931, the organization published its periodical Shqiptarja ("The Albanian [f]"), which featured many articles contributed by Parashqevi and her sister Sevasti. The journal took issue with conservative thinking, championing the women's movement and its demands.

Parashqevi stood as a firm anti-fascist throughout World War II, starting from the Italian invasion of 1939. Because of her anti-fascist views, she and her sister were sent to the Anhalteleger Dedinje camp near Belgrade by pro-Nazi units led by Xhaferr Deva.

She survived and returned to Tirana after the war, but she and her sister's family then faced further persecution. Because of his past affiliation with Zog, Kristo Dako was posthumously vilified by the communist regime, and the Kyrias families were forced out of Tirana. Parashqevi's two nephews (Sevasti's sons) would be imprisoned, and eventually one died in prison.

The efforts of Albanian scholar Skënder Luarasi and woman politician Vito Kapo led eventually to the partial rehabilitation of the Kyrias sisters. Parashqevi died in Tirana on December 17, 1970.

Published Works
The following works are known to have been written by Parashqevi Qiriazi:
“The Albanian Girls’ School at Kortcha”. Life and Light for Woman XXXV, nr. 8 (Boston: Woman’s Board of Missions, August 1905).
"The Development of Schools in the Turkish Empire and an Ideal System of Education for Albania", in Albania, the Master Key to the Near East (Boston: E.L. Grimes, 1919), p. 248-266. (Republished 2020, IAPS).  
Abetare për shkollat e para. (Manastir: Bashkimi i Kombit, 1909).

Legacy
 Parashqevi Qiriazi and her sister Sevasti Qiriazi are known colloquially in Albania as "the Qiriazi Sisters". They are considered the "mothers of Albanian education". 
 Several educational institutions and organizations in Albania and Kosovo bear their name. 
 In ca. 2017, a college bearing the Qiriazi name was opened on the property of the orignal Kyrias Institute (1922–1933) in Kamëz, Albania. 
 An Albanian-American Women's Organization (AAWO) in New York City bears the sisters' name.

Further reading 
 Toska, Teuta. Parashqevi Qiriazi dhe viti i saj 1919. Tirana: ISSHP, 2020,  (winner of the Academy of Sciences of Albania's 2022 "Aleks Buda" prize).
 Kyrias-Dako, Sevasti. My Life: The autobiography of the pioneer of female education in Albania. Tiranë: IAPS, 2022, .
 Hosaflook, David. Lëvizja Protestante te shqiptarët, 1816–1908. Skopje: Instituti i Trashëgimisë Shpirtërore e Kulturore të Shqiptarëve, 2019,  (winner of the Academy of Sciences of Albania's 2021 "Trinity of Albanology: Meyer-Pedersen-Jokl" prize – 2nd prize).
 Quanrud, John and David Hosaflook. "Were the Kyrias siblings, Kristo Dako, and the Kortcha Girls School Protestant? A response to the re-emergence of a communist-era narrative". IAPS, 2023 (or in Albanian – https://instituti.org/vellezerit-dhe-motrat-qiriazi-kristo-dako-dhe-shkolla-e-vashave-e-korces-a-ishin-protestante
 Hosaflook, David. Precious Alphabet, Precious Fatherland: the Unknown Origin of Albania's Alphabet Hymn. Skopje: ITSHKSH and ISSHP, 2018. https://www.academia.edu/37829263/Precious_Alphabet_Precious_Fatherland_the_Unknown_Origin_of_Albanias_Alphabet_Hymn

See also
 Albanian alphabet
 Congress of Monastir
 Kyrias Family
 Fatbardha Gega

References

1880 births
1970 deaths
People from Bitola
People from Manastir vilayet
Albanians from the Ottoman Empire
Albanian Protestants
Linguists from Albania
Activists of the Albanian National Awakening
Albanian educators
Albanian schoolteachers
Albanian women's rights activists
Albanian suffragists
19th-century Albanian people
Banjica concentration camp survivors
Robert College alumni
Parashqevi
Albanian educational theorists
20th-century linguists